The Yoga Alliance is a U.S.-based nonprofit membership trade and professional organization for yoga teachers. The organization is headquartered in Arlington, Virginia.

Registered Yoga Teacher, a title in the United States that designates a yoga teacher who has received a certain standard of yoga teacher training at a Registered Yoga School, is offered by the Yoga Alliance at 200-, 300- and 500-hour levels. Currently, there are over 90,000 yoga teachers who have met the criteria for registered teachers.

The Yoga Alliance states that its registry is a voluntary credentialing system. The teacher registry is not a certification program, but a listing of teachers who meet Yoga Alliance's Requirements for teaching experience and have completed their training at a Registered Yoga School.

Standards

RYS 200 

The Yoga Alliance has since 2021 published "Elevated Standards" for its basic Registered Yoga School 200 hours teaching credential. The core curriculum consists of 75 hours of techniques, training, and practice in asana, pranayama and subtle body, and meditation; 30 hours on anatomy, physiology, and biomechanics, of which 20 can be taught online; 30 hours of yoga humanities, covering history, philosophy, and ethics (such as from the Yoga Sutras) of yoga; and 50 hours of professional skills, covering teaching methodology, professional development, and teaching practice ("practicum").

Ethical commitment 

In addition to the technical standards, the Yoga Alliance has published an "Ethical Commitment" which consists of a code of conduct, a scope of practice, and a commitment to equity in yoga. All members are required to abide by this commitment. The code of conduct covers behavior on training programs and classes, appropriate student-teacher relationships, touching only by consent, and honesty. The scope of practice sets out the yoga teacher's role including teaching and advising. Equity in yoga draws attention to existing inequities in and around yoga practice and sets out to remedy those.

See also

 British Wheel of Yoga
 European Union of Yoga
 Sexual abuse by yoga gurus#Policy

References

External links

Non-profit organizations based in Arlington, Virginia
Yoga organizations
Yoga training and certification